Flavius Avitus Marinianus ( 423–448) was a politician of the Western Roman Empire during the reign of Honorius.

Biography 
Avitus was praetorian prefect and consul in 423 He is mentioned in the Gesta de purgatione Xysti III episcopi''' in a list of aristocrats involved in the investigations against Pope Sixtus III. Although the Gesta has been long recognized as a later forgery, B.L. Twyman argued in 1970 that the list of aristocrats was taken from a later papal investigation concerning the deposition of bishop Celidonius by archbishop Hilarius of Arles. T.D. Barnes subsequently showed that the list was best explained as the product of "a writer of the sixth century [who] has deliberately mixed genuine and fictitious persons."

He had a wife, Anastasia, and a son, Rufius Praetextatus Postumianus (consul in 448); it is possible that Rufius Viventius Gallus was another son. Marinianus and his wife were Christians; at Pope Leo I's request, they restored the mosaic on the façade of the Old St. Peter's Basilica, as recorded by an inscription on the mosaic itself.

 Notes 

 Further reading 
 Jones, Arnold Hugh Martin, John Robert Martindale, John Morris, The Prosopography of the Later Roman Empire'', Volume 2, Cambridge University Press, 1992, pp. 723–724.

5th-century Romans
5th-century Roman consuls
Imperial Roman consuls
Praetorian prefects